Finnish Open may refer to:

 Finnish Open (darts)
 Finnish Open (badminton)
 Finnish Open (golf)